Acacia acanthaster is a shrub belonging to the genus Acacia and the subgenus Phyllodineae. It is native to an area in the Great Southern and Goldfields-Esperance regions of Western Australia.

Description
It blooms from August to October and produces yellow flowers. The simple inflorescences have globular heads globular with a diameter of composed of 18 to 27 flowers. It later forms seed pods that are strongly arcuate to loosely coiled in shape.

Taxonomy
The species was first formally described by the botanist Bruce Maslin in 1999 in the article Acacia miscellany 16. The taxonomy of fifty-five species of Acacia, primarily Western Australian, in section Phyllodineae (Leguminosae: Mimosoideae) as published in the journal Nuytsia. The only synonym is Racosperma acanthaster.

Ecology
The tree is found as part of Eucalyptus woodland or mallee shrubland communities. It has a discontinuous distribution with the bulk of the population locatedg between Dumbleyung, Lake King and Narembeen where it grows in sand, sandy clay, and granitic loam soils.

See also
 List of Acacia species

References

acanthaster
Acacias of Western Australia
Plants described in 1999
Taxa named by Bruce Maslin